The 2012 VMI Keydets football team represented the Virginia Military Institute in the 2012 NCAA Division I FCS football season. The Keydets compete in the Big South Conference under head coach Sparky Woods, who was in his 5th season with VMI. They finished the season 2–9, 1–5 in Big South play to finish in sixth place.

Schedule

Game summaries

Delaware State

Chowan

Richmond

Navy

Presbyterian

Charleston Southern

Coastal Carolina

Gardner–Webb

Stony Brook

The Citadel

Liberty

References

VMI
VMI Keydets football seasons
VMI Keydets football